Manuel José Carazo Bonilla  (1808–1877) was a Costa Rican politician.

He was the son of Joaqiín Carazo y Alvarado, signatory of the Act of Independence of Costa Rica, and Ana Francisca de Bonilla. His uncle was, among others, Nicolás Carazo and Alvarado and Don Pedro José Carazo and Alvarado, also signatories of the Act.

References

Vice presidents of Costa Rica
Finance ministers of Costa Rica
1808 births
1877 deaths